Myriopteris yatskievychiana is a small fern native to Mexico, a member of the family Pteridaceae. It is known only from a single collection in the Mexican state of Sonora. While superficially similar to golden lip fern, a widespread species in Mexico, differences in its coating of hairs and its small size make it distinctive. One of the cheilanthoid ferns, it was usually classified in the genus Cheilanthes until 2013, when the genus Myriopteris was again recognized as separate from Cheilanthes.

Description
They are dull and uniformly pale brown in color.

The stipe (the stalk of the leaf, below the blade) is one-quarter to one-third of the total leaf length, dark reddish-brown with color and darkening to black with age. The stipe is rounded and about 0.6 mm in diameter.

The leaf blades are linear in shape. They bear 16 to 22 pairs of shallowly-lobed, oblong pinnae. Both upper and lower surfaces of the leaf blade are densely covered with straight white hairs, obscuring the tissue of the leaf.

On fertile fronds, the sori are protected by false indusia formed by the edge of the leaf curling back over the underside. The false indusia are not differentiated from the rest of the leaf tissue, and are only slightly curved back. The sori are concentrated at vein ends and contain tan spores.

Taxonomy
Myriopteris yatskievychiana was first described by John Mickel in 2004, as Cheilanthes yatskievychiana, based on material collected by Alberto Búrquez in 1996 from San Javier Municipality, Sonora. It was named in honor of pteridologist George Yatskievych, who noticed the unusual characteristics of the specimen.

The development of molecular phylogenetic methods showed that the traditional circumscription of Cheilanthes is polyphyletic. Convergent evolution in arid environments is thought to be responsible for widespread homoplasy in the morphological characters traditionally used to classify it and the segregate genera that have sometimes been recognized. On the basis of molecular evidence, Amanda Grusz and Michael D. Windham revived the genus Myriopteris in 2013 for a group of species formerly placed in Cheilanthes. One of these was C. yatskievychiana, which thus became Myriopteris yatskievychiana. Further molecular studies in Myriopteris demonstrated the existence of three well-supported clades within the genus. M. yatskievychiana belongs to what Grusz et al. informally named the covillei clade. M. yatskievychiana and the similar M. aurea are sister to the rest of the clade; all other members of the clade, except M. newberryi, belong to the "core covillei" clade, with leaves finely divided into bead-like segments, quite dissimilar to M. yatskievychiana.

Distribution and habitat
Myriopteris yatskievychiana is known only from the type specimen. It was collected in Platanus forest in a deep canyon in Sonora.

Notes and references

References

Works cited

External links

yatskievychiana
Ferns of Mexico
Plants described in 2004
Endemic flora of Mexico